The HTC U Ultra is an Android-based smartphone manufactured and sold by HTC. It was released in February 2017. It was one of the first two devices of the new HTC U series (with the other being the HTC U Play).

Specifications

Hardware 
The HTC U Ultra has a glass body with a non-removable 3000 mAh battery, a 5.7-inch capacitive touchscreen display with a 2.05-inch secondary display similar to the LG V20. The rear camera has a 12 megapixel sensor with optical image stabilization, dual LED flash, and a f/1.8 aperture with support for HDR. The front camera has a 16 megapixel sensor that shoots 1080p video and has an auto-HDR mode. Internal storage is either 64 or 128 gigabytes with support for microSD cards up to 256 GB and it weighs 170 grams.

Software 
The HTC U Ultra ships with Android 7.0 Nougat overlaid with the HTC Sense UI. It is upgradable to Android 8.0 Oreo.

Reception 

The HTC U Ultra received mixed to negative reviews.

Android Police's David Ruddock liked the phone's large size and the high-gloss glass construction of the phone as well as the "lighter touch" of HTC's Sense skin that "includes some useful software tweaks", but lamented its lack of a headphone jack, its "poor battery life" which he attributed to the "awful" screen to battery ratio, its lack of carrier support and no ruggedization features and its $750 price, which he felt was "simply way too much".

Andrew Martonik of Android Central praised the phone's "fantastic" performance, the "great" screen, "stunning" hardware, lack of bloatware the fact that the phone came unlocked and that it "absolutely nails the basics" but derided its "2016-level camera performance", lack of a headphone jack, the lack of utility for the second screen, no water resistance and the phone being too big for most hands. In the quick take he said "HTC continues to get the basics right with flagships. The U Ultra has a great screen, amazing build quality and stunning design. You get just about every spec inside you'd expect, and the day-to-day performance as a result is fantastic with a super-smooth software experience. Unfortunately, HTC's camera performance once again lags behind the pack, its secondary display is all but useless and there's no headphone jack or water resistance — all in a phone that's charging a premium price of $749."

Writing for ZDNet, Matthew Miller singled out the gorilla glass on the front and back, the "high quality fit and finish", the "vibrant" BoomSound speakers and the "good" quality of the included earbuds as pros, but panned its large size, lack of a headphone jack, no water resistance and "average battery life and called the back a "fingerprint magnet". In the conclusion he stated "As it is, there are just too many compromises at the $749 price for me to commit to one now."

Further information
Android Authority Review
The Verge — HTC’s sapphire U Ultra is more scratch resistant than any iPhone or Galaxy phone (Sapphire U Ultra)

References 

U Ultra
Android (operating system) devices
Mobile phones introduced in 2017
Discontinued smartphones